Methodist theologians include those theologians affiliated with any of the Methodist denominational churches such as The United Methodist Church, independent Methodists, or churches affiliated with the Holiness Movement including the Church of the Nazarene, the Free Methodist Church, the Wesleyan Methodist Church (America), the Wesleyan Methodist Church (Great Britain), the Pilgrim Holiness Church, and the Wesleyan Church, as well as other church organizations.

Proto-Methodist theologians

 Jacobus Arminius - ordained pastor of the Dutch Reformed church, studied under Theodore Beza and rejected the teachings of John Calvin, inspired the Remonstrance and the soteriological system now known as Arminianism.
 Hugo Grotius - playwright, poet, and humanist philosopher of the Aristotelian tradition, systematized Arminianism and developed the moral government theory of Christ's atonement.
 John Goodwin - Puritan-Arminian (1594–1665)

18th century
 John Wesley
 Charles Wesley
 George Whitefield
 John Fletcher
 Thomas Coke
 Joseph Benson

19th century
 Nathan Bangs - Arminian apologist, first editor of the Methodist magazine Christian Advocate, opposed the antinomianism of the New Light Baptist community. Wrote six significant theological letters to a Presbyterian pastor, Rev. S. Williston.
 Amos Binney
 Borden Parker Bowne - wrote numerous books on various theological themes; renowned as a philosopher and theologian.
 Jabez Bunting - author of numerous articles and published sermons.
 Adam Clarke - Biblical theologian uncomfortable with systematic approaches to Christian theology, Wrote a single volume theology. He also wrote a commentary which became one of the most widely used commentaries of all time. 
 Helenor M. Davisson - the first woman ordained in American Methodist Church.
 Wilbur Fisk - religious educator, favored ending slavery progressively (rather than in the revolutionary way proposed by other notable abolitionists, so as to avoid a split in the Church), early influence on the temperance movement.
 Hugh Price Hughes - Welsh social reformer, first editor of the Methodist Times and first superintendent of the West London Methodist Mission.
 John Miley - wrote a two-volume systematic theology (1893). Rejected the penal substitution theory of the atonement and advocated a moral government theory.
 Phoebe Palmer - female author, theologian, and preacher. Spoke specifically on holiness and sanctification
 William Burt Pope - wrote a 3-volume systematic theology.
 James Strong
 Richard Watson - outspoken British abolitionist, wrote against Clarke in defense of the eternal Sonship of Christ, one of the first theologians to systematize Wesley's theology.

Methodist